The Forty-fifth Amendment of the Constitution of India, officially known as The Constitution (Forty-fifth Amendment) Act, 1980, extended the period of reservation of seats for the Scheduled Castes and Scheduled Tribes and representation of the Anglo-Indians in the Lok Sabha and the State Legislative Assemblies for another ten years, i.e. up to 26 January 1990.

Article 334 of the Constitution had originally required the reservation of seats to cease in 1960, but this was extended to 1970 by the 8th Amendment, and the 23rd Amendment extended this period to 1980. The 45th Amendment extended the period of reservation to 1990. The period of reservation was extended to 2000, 2010, 2020 and 2030 by the 62nd, 79th, 95th and 104th Amendments respectively.

Text

The full text of Article 334 of the Constitution, after the 45th Amendment, is given below:

Proposal and enactment
The Constitution (Forty-fifth Amendment) Bill, 1980 (Bill No. 1 of 1980) was introduced in the Lok Sabha on 23 January 1980 by Zail Singh, then Minister of Home Affairs. The Bill sought to amend article 334 of the Constitution relating to reservation of seats for the Scheduled Castes and the Scheduled Tribes and special representation of the Anglo-Indian community in the House of the People and in the Legislative Assemblies of the States. The full text of the Statement of Objects and Reasons appended to the bill is given below:

The Bill was debated by the Lok Sabha on 24 January 1980 and passed on the same day in the original form. The Rajya Sabha considered and passed the bill on 25 January 1980. The bill, after ratification by the States, received assent from then President Neelam Sanjiva Reddy on 14 April 1980, and was notified in The Gazette of India on the same date. It retroactively came into effect from 25 January 1980.

Ratification
The Act was passed in accordance with the provisions of Article 368 of the Constitution, and was ratified by more than half of the State Legislatures, as required under Clause (2) of the said article. State Legislatures that ratified the amendment are listed below:

 Andhra Pradesh
 Haryana
 Himachal Pradesh
 Jammu and Kashmir
 Karnataka
 Kerala
 Madhya Pradesh
 Manipur
 Meghalaya
 Nagaland
 Sikkim 
 Tripura
 West Bengal

Did not ratify:
 Assam
 Bihar
 Gujarat
 Maharashtra
 Orissa
 Punjab
 Rajasthan
 Tamil Nadu
 Uttar Pradesh

See also
List of amendments of the Constitution of India

References

45
1980 in India
1980 in law
Indira Gandhi administration